Justin Scott may refer to:

 Justin Scott (musician)
 Big K.R.I.T. (rapper), born Justin Scott
 Justin Scott (writer)
Justin Scott (ice hockey)